The 1998–99 European football season was the 95th season of Sport Lisboa e Benfica's existence and the club's 65th consecutive season in the top flight of Portuguese football. The season ran from 1 July 1998 to 30 June 1999; Benfica competed domestically in the Primeira Divisão and the Taça de Portugal. The club also participated in the UEFA Champions League as a result of finishing second in the Primeira Divisão in the previous season.

After guiding Benfica to second place, Graeme Souness remained in charge for a first full season. The Scottish brought in a handful of British players to the team, but only Michael Thomas, Mark Pembridge and Dean Saunders got regular playing time. To offset, Benfica lost the likes of Edgar Pacheco, Brian Deane and Scott Minto.

The season started with the qualifying rounds of the UEFA Champions League, which the club successfully passes, although not without drama. Domestically, Benfica fared better, quickly reaching the top spots by early October. However, a home draw with Alverca, starts a six-match winless spree that put them in fifth place in the league and negatively impacted their Champions League campaign.

Benfica eventually regained their step in the Primeira Divisão. From late November till early February, they won 8 out of 9 matches, including seven in a row. This allowed them to battle the second place with Boavista with a match between in 14 March assuming significant importance. Benfica lost and started another downward spiral of erratic results that eventually led to the dismissal of Souness. Long-time assistant Shéu finished the season, with Benfica reaching 65 points, 14 less than Porto. Nuno Gomes had its best season of his career, scoring 34 goals in all competitions.

Season summary
Following a season, where Benfica made a convincing second round, collecting 41 out of 51 points. Souness had his status increased, with more influence on player signings and the technical staff around him. One of his first decisions was replacing Nelo Vingada by his personal friend, Phil Boersma. Vingada work as assistant was influential in helping Souness understand the intricacy of Portuguese football. The Scottish also brought in reinforcements from England, inspired by the effect that Poborský and Brian Deane had in the team, when they joined in January. After a pre-season that saw them meet Newcastle United, Sheffield United and Italians, Empoli and Lazio, the team was set to debut in the qualifying rounds of the Champions League against Beitar Jerusalem. With a six nil thrashing in the first leg, the second leg was a mere formality. However, in Israel, the team suffered a setback, conceding four goals, that although it did not harm progress to the group stage, it upset the management.

In the league, Benfica started in the best possible way, amassing three consecutive wins and reaching top of the table. A loss in Faro dropped them to second, but did not stop their momentum, as two more wins and a hard-fought draw against F.C. Alverca followed. Equal on the first place, the team visited Boavista next. A last minute goal from Martelinho forced Benfica to spend the week in fifth place. In Europe, the situation was not any better, with five points dropped against HJK Helsinki, who were making their debut in the group stage of the Champions League.

After five points earned in three match days in early November, the team faced FC Porto for the Clássico on the road, losing for a fifth consecutive season, and ending up in fifth place with a seven-point gap for the leader. In Europe, Benfica finished second in his group, with another late goal costing them points, now against PSV Eindhoven. Nonetheless, with the advancing season, Benfica performance improved, starting a seven-game winning streak that spread two months, and saw the jump to second, only a point behind leaders Porto. They were stopped in late January, when S.C. Beira-Mar draw them at home.

In February the team conceded a fourth league loss, which was followed by the premature exit of the Portuguese Cup. Still, they recovered by winning the two subsequent games, matching Boavista on the league table, and facing them next, knowing that a win, would put the team one point behind leaders Porto. On 14 March, Souness decided to Gary Charles and Steve Harkness, the first was coming out of an injury and the second arrived days before. Benfica lost 0–3, dropped to third place and Souness saw his first handkerchiefs. A week later Benfica draw against U.D. Leiria, bagging only one point out of six possible in a crucial part of the season.

April would be much the same, with five points lost out of nine possible, the advantage over the fourth place, Sporting was reduced to two points. With a home draw against S.C. Campomaiorense in early May, and in danger of losing the third place, Souness was sacked with immediate effect. He was banned from entering the stadium, and Shéu replaced him in the final four matches, winning seven points out of twelve, but more importantly, securing the third place.

Competitions

Overall record

Primeira Divisão

League table

Results by round

Matches

Taça de Portugal

UEFA Champions League

Second qualifying round

Group stage

Friendlies

Player statistics
The squad for the season consisted of the players listed in the tables below, as well as staff member Graeme Souness (manager), Phil Boersma (assistant manager) and Shéu (assistant and later manager).

|}

Transfers

In

Out

Out by loan

Notes

References

Bibliography
 

S.L. Benfica seasons
Benfica